The Chicago Public Library (CPL) is the public library system that serves the City of Chicago in the U.S. state of Illinois. It consists of 81 locations, including a central library, two regional libraries, and branches distributed throughout the city's 77 Community Areas.

The American Library Association reports that the library holds 5,721,334 volumes, making it the ninth largest public library in the United States by volumes held, and the 30th largest academic or public library in the United States by volumes held. The Chicago Public Library is the second largest library system in Chicago by volumes held (the largest is the University of Chicago Library). The library is the second largest public library system in the Midwest, after the Detroit Public Library.  Unlike many public libraries, CPL uses the Library of Congress cataloging classification system rather than Dewey Decimal.

History

In the aftermath of the 1871 Great Chicago Fire, Londoner A.H. Burgess, with the aid of Thomas Hughes, drew up what would be called the "English Book Donation," which proposed that England should provide a free library to the burnt-out city. The Chicago Public Library was created directly from the ashes of the great Chicago Fire. Burgess wrote on December 7, 1871 in The Daily News that "I propose that England should present a Free Library to Chicago, to remain there as a mark of sympathy now, and a keepsake and a token of true brotherly kindness forever..."

After circulating requests for donations throughout English society, the project donated 8,000 books. Private donors included Queen Victoria, Benjamin Disraeli, Alfred Lord Tennyson, Robert Browning, John Stuart Mill, John Ruskin, and Matthew Arnold.

In Chicago, town leaders petitioned Mayor Joseph Medill to hold a meeting and establish the library. The meeting led to the Illinois Library Act of 1872, which allowed Illinois cities to establish tax-supported libraries. In April 1872, the Chicago City Council passed an ordinance establishing the Chicago Public Library. In the rebuilding section of the city, on January 1, 1873, the Chicago Public Library officially opened its doors in an abandoned iron water tank at LaSalle and Adams Streets. The collection included 3,157 volumes. A two-story office building was soon built around it to hold city offices, and a third floor reading room was built for the library.

On October 24, 1873, William Frederick Poole was elected the first head librarian by the library's board of directors. Poole was mainly concerned during his tenure on building the circulation. In 1874, circulation services began with 13,000 out of 17,533 available for lending. The library moved from place to place during its first 24 years. Eleven years it spent on the fourth floor of city hall. In 1887, Poole resigned to organize the private, research Newberry Library of Chicago.

On October 15, 1887, Frederick H. Hild was elected the second Librarian of the Chicago Public Library and securing a permanent home was his primary drive. Ten years later, the Central Library was opened. Designed by the Boston firm of Shepley, Rutan and Coolidge in the same academic classical style as their building for the Art Institute of Chicago, it is located on Michigan Avenue between Washington Street and Randolph Street on land donated by the Grand Army of the Republic, a Civil War Veterans group led by John A. Logan, a Civil War General and U.S. Senator from Illinois. In return for the land, the Library was to maintain a Civil War collection and exhibit in a G.A.R. room until the last northern Civil War veteran died. The library would remain on this site for the next 96 years. The building is now the Chicago Cultural Center.

Henry Eduard Legler assumed the leadership of the Chicago Public Library on October 11, 1909. Previously a Wisconsin Progressive, he was well known as an aggressive advocate of the expansion of library service. In 1916, Legler presented his "Library Plan for the Whole City," the first comprehensive branch library system in the nation. A landmark in library history, the plan called for an extensive network of neighborhood library locations throughout Chicago. The goal of the plan was to bring "library service within the walking distance of home for every person in Chicago who can read or wants to use books."
Legler was succeeded by his assistant Carl B. Roden in 1918. Roden served as Chief Librarian until 1950. The South Chicago Branch library history from 1937-1947 has been explored by Latham who focused on its service to an industrial community and adult education. She has also examined the role of the John Toman Branch library from 1927-1940. 

Roden was succeeded in 1951 by Chief Librarian Gertrude E. Gscheidle. During her tenure the Library expanded its service to Chicago's neighborhoods by modernizing its bookmobile services.
In the 1960s several new neighborhood branch libraries were constructed or were established in leased storefronts or reading rooms.

The two-story,  Carter G. Woodson Regional Library, named after the "Father of Modern Black Historiography," opened its doors in December 1975. A decade later, Chicago Public Library replaced its north side regional library when the Conrad Sulzer Regional Library opened to the public in late 1985. The Woodson branch library features the Vivian G. Harsh Research Collection, one of the largest repositories of African-American archival information in the Midwest. It holds the papers of many notable Chicagoans, such as John H. Sengstacke, Robert S. Abbott, Doris E. Saunders, Timuel Black, Rev. Addie L. Wyatt, and numerous others.

The class politics of urban public librarianship through "outreach" efforts during the federal War on Poverty uses the Chicago Public Library as a case study during the 1970s under director Alex Ladenson.

In 1974, the board of directors authorized an $11 million renovation of the Central Library. While the restoration of the original central library proved a great success, the collections remained warehoused outside the old library while the City debated the status of the future of the central library. One plan was to move the library to the former Rothchild/Goldblatts Department Store which stood empty on Chicago's State Street and had reverted to City ownership.

From 1982 to 1985, Amanda Sullivan Randle Rudd rose to become the first African-American to head of the Chicago Public Library system. Rudd had experienced segregated libraries during her childhood in South Carolina.  Her stewardship in Chicago saw a particular focus on literacy services, and she strongly mentored younger colleagues, including a future Librarian of Congress, Carla Hayden.

The Chicago Sun-Times editorial board and Cindy Pritzker, then President of the Library Board, launched a grassroots campaign to build a new state-of-the-art central library. On July 29, 1987, Mayor Harold Washington and the Chicago City Council authorized a design and construction competition for a new, one-and-a-half block $144 million library at 400 South State Street.

Current services
In 1991, the Harold Washington Library Center, Chicago's new central library, named for the late mayor, opened to the public. It was the world's largest municipal public library at the time of its opening. It is accessible from the Brown, Orange, Purple and new Pink Line trains at the "Library" stop, from the Blue Line at the "LaSalle" and "Jackson" stops, as well as from the Red Line at the "Jackson" stop.

In January 1994, Mary A. Dempsey was appointed Library Commissioner by Mayor Richard M. Daley and served in that role until January 2012. Under her direction, the Library launched the largest branch building program in its history, constructing or renovating 44 branch libraries; installed more than 2500 free public access computers and wifi throughout the library system; completed 2 strategic plans; established professional development and training programs for all library staff; and launched signature programs such as One Book, One Chicago; YOUmedia the museum and Ravinia free admission programs; Teen Volume; Law at the Library; and Money Smart financial literacy programs for adults and teens. The library's success in revitalizing communities through branch library development was analyzed by Robert Putnam in 2003.

The "Charlotte Kim Scholar in Residence Program" took place from 1999–2008. Scholars  included Camila Alire (1999); Leigh Estabrook (2002); Kathleen de la Peña McCook (2003); Joan C. Durrance (2004); Michael Stephens (2005); Maureen Sullivan (2006); George Needham (2007) and Patricia Martin (2008).

The Engaged Library: Chicago Stories of Community Building published by the Urban Library Council (2006) highlights several Chicago public libraries and their efforts in strengthening the community and effectively enhancing the well-being and capacities of urban neighborhood residents, associations, non-profits and public institutions.

Brian Andrew Bannon was appointed as Library Commissioner in January 2012 and assumed the role in March 2012.

Some of the free programming the Chicago Public Library offers include:  The One Book One Chicago program, The Summer Learning Challenge, Bookamania (held every November),  Kids Museum Passport Program (allows patrons free admission to a variety of Chicago's world-class institutions), and Words and Music Program (which provides patrons with free lawn tickets to selected Ravinia concerts). The library also offers a free homework help desk daily in order to serve struggling students after school.

The Chicago Public Library offers free lecture series covering a variety of topics including: Law at the Library (a free monthly lecture series that offers participants the opportunity to speak with a legal professional about a variety of legal topics), Money Smart (a series of financial literacy programs), and Author Series.

The Chicago Public Library provides access to a large selection of databases, most of which are also available for use at home or other remote location with a Chicago Public Library card. Internet computers are available for anyone with a Chicago Public Library card. Also, anyone can use the Wi-Fi on their own laptops, tablets and smartphones without a library card.

In June 2013, the library announced a $1 million grant from the Bill & Melinda Gates Foundation establishing a partnership between the Chicago Public Library and the public library system of Aarhus, Denmark.

That same month, the Library opened its Innovation Lab, featuring a Maker Lab with 3D software, milling machine, laser cutters, and 3D printers.  The space has proven highly successful in offering free access to the latest in advanced manufacturing technology and was awarded the Chicago Innovation Awards Social Innovator Award in October 2013.

In late 2013, a study released by the Information Science Department of Heinrich Heine University in Düsseldorf, Germany ranked Chicago Public Library first in the United States and third in the world, when comparing 31 major urban libraries taking leadership roles in supporting "smart cities" in a "knowledge economy."

In 2019,  CPL became the largest public library system in the United States to eliminate fines for borrowed overdue items.  All existing fines were forgiven.  There will still be due dates, and patrons are still required to return items or replace them to continue their borrowing privileges.

In 2023, the CPL celebrated its 150th anniversary with an exhibit exploring the history of its branches.

Branches

Central library
Harold Washington Library Center

Regional libraries

North

 Sulzer Regional Library

South

 Woodson Regional Library

Branches

North District
 Albany Park Branch
 Austin-Irving Branch
 Harold Bezazian Branch (Uptown)
 Bucktown-Wicker Park Branch
 Budlong Woods Branch
 Richard M. Daley (West Humboldt Park) Branch
 Dunning Branch
 Edgebrook Branch
 Edgewater Branch
 Galewood-Mont Clare Branch
 Humboldt Park Branch
 Independence Branch
 Jefferson Park Branch
 Lincoln-Belmont Branch
 Lincoln Park Branch
 Logan Square Branch
 Mayfair Branch
 John Merlo Branch
 North Austin Branch
 North Pulaski Branch
 Northtown Branch
 Oriole Park Branch
 Portage-Cragin Branch
 Roden Branch
 Rogers Park Branch
 Uptown Branch
 West Belmont Branch

Central District

 Austin Branch
 Back of the Yards Branch
 Blackstone Branch
 Brighton Park Branch
 Canaryville Branch
 Chicago Bee Branch
 Chinatown Branch
 Richard J. Daley Branch
 Douglass Branch
 Gage Park Branch
 Garfield Ridge Branch
 George Cleveland Hall Branch
 Martin Luther King, Jr. Branch
 Legler Branch
 Little Italy Branch
 Little Village Branch
 Rudy Lozano Branch
 Mabel Manning Branch
 McKinley Park Branch
 Near North Branch
 Sherman Park Branch
 Toman Branch
 Water Works Outpost
 West Chicago Avenue Branch
 West Loop Branch
 West Town Branch

South District

 Altgeld Branch
 Avalon Branch
 Beverly Branch
 Brainerd Branch
 Chicago Lawn Branch
 Clearing Branch
 Bessie Coleman Branch
 Greater Grand Crossing Branch
 Hegewisch Branch
 Jeffery Manor Branch
 Kelly Branch
 Thurgood Marshall Branch
 Mount Greenwood Branch
 Pullman Branch
 Scottsdale Branch
 South Chicago Branch
 South Shore Branch
 Vodak East Side Branch
 Walker Branch
 West Englewood Branch
 West Lawn Branch
 West Pullman Branch
 Wrightwood-Ashburn Branch
 Whitney M. Young, Jr. Branch

See also

 List of museums and cultural institutions in Chicago

References

External links

 Chicago Public Library website
 Mapping the Stacks – library's website devoted to Black history archives
 
 Chicago Public Library Android application
 Books catalog
 Map of branch locations
 Carl B Roden Papers at Newberry Library

 
Public libraries in Illinois
1873 establishments in Illinois